Anonymous is the third studio album by the musical supergroup Tomahawk. It was released on June 19, 2007, through Ipecac Recordings, the record label owned by the band's vocalist Mike Patton. Anonymous charted in Australia, Norway and the United States.

Recorded after the departure of bass player Kevin Rutmanis, the songs on Anonymous are based on Native American compositions researched by guitarist Duane Denison. The album has received mixed-to-positive reviews, being described as faithful to its source material. One single, "Sun Dance", was released to support the album.

Production 

Anonymous was recorded after the departure of Tomahawk's bass player Kevin Rutmanis, leaving a lineup composed of Mike Patton, Duane Denison and John Stanier. Denison and Stanier recorded their musical parts for the album in Nashville, Tennessee, before sending them to Patton in San Francisco to add vocal parts and samples; the resulting album was a mix of live studio recordings and overdubbed sounds. Due to the absence of Rutmanis, both Denison and Patton recorded bass tracks for the album; Patton's former Mr. Bungle bandmate Trevor Dunn filled this vacancy in 2012.

The songs on Anonymous are based on Native American compositions, which Denison had researched while touring Indian reservations with musician Hank Williams III. During that tour, Denison had listened to Native American rock groups and was disappointed "at how normal they sounded", having expected to hear music that was "more aggressive, spookier and more kinetic" than the Southern rock and country rock he had heard.  Denison found transcriptions of traditional music, and based his work for the album on these—the title Anonymous is a reference to the uncredited composers of this source material. The original compositions were mostly written with one melody line—often for a nose flute—with a simple accompaniment such as hand clapping. As a result, Denison has said the group "took a lot of liberties, and filled in a lot of space", leaving much of the album newly composed around these simple frameworks. Denison has called Anonymous a "kind of a detour" from Tomahawk's usual sound, and described it as a concept album.

Release and reception 

Anonymous was released on June 19, 2007, through Ipecac Recordings, the record label owned by Patton and Greg Werckman. The album's release was preceded by a digital single, "Sun Dance", on June 12. The B-side to the single was the non-album track "El Tecolote".

Reviews for Anonymous have been mildly positive. Writing for AllMusic, Jason Lymangrover rated the album four stars out of five, calling it "undeniably a stunning musical exploration". Lymangrover compared the album to Frank Zappa's Apostrophe (') and Mr. Bungle's California, also noting similarities to Patton's other supergroup Fantômas. Sputnik Music Andrew H awarded the album a score of 4 out of 5, calling it "arguably the best Tomahawk [album] to date". The review praised Denison's work on retaining a faithful Native American tone on the compositions, while still allowing the album to sound familiar as a Tomahawk recording. Andrew Earles of The A.V. Club rated the album a "B", finding Patton's vocals uncharacteristically subtle. Earles felt that the album's best songs were "Cradle Song", "Omaha Dance", and "Antelope Ceremony", but felt negatively about "War Song" and "Red Fox".

Pitchfork Jason Crock gave the album a rating of 5.9 out of 10, calling it an "odd, headstrong little record". Crock felt that the group were respectfully faithful to the musical culture within which they were working, but described the resultant sound as resembling a film score more than a live band. Writing for PopMatters, Mike Schiller rated Anonymous 6 out of 10. Schiller felt that Patton's vocal work had an "air of non-commitment", but praised Denison's enthusiasm for the project, concluding that it might have worked better as an instrumental album. Schiller highlighted "Ghost Dance", "War Song" and "Long, Long Weary Day" as the best songs on the album. A review in CMJ New Music Monthly described Anonymous as "the real wampum", finding it to be a respectful tribute to Native American music.

Chart performance 

In the United States, Anonymous reached a peak position of 158 in the Billboard 200 albums chart, spending only one week in the chart. Among the other charts published by Billboard, Anonymous attained a peak of 12 on the Independent Albums chart and 2 on the Top Heatseekers countdown, spending two weeks in the former and three in the latter. It also achieved a position of 13 on the Tastemakers chart, where it remained for one week. Anonymous also recorded chart positions in Norway and Australia, making it to number 31 on the VG-lista chart, and number 32 on the ARIA Charts.

Track listing

Personnel

Charts

See also 
 Music for The Native Americans, a 1994 album by Robbie Robertson

References 

2007 albums
Concept albums
Ipecac Recordings albums
Tomahawk (band) albums
Native American music albums